Gransdorf is municipality in western Germany, near Bitburg. It belongs to the district Bitburg-Prüm, in the state of Rhineland-Palatinate.
In 1098 it was mentioned the first time as "Grandesdorf" in a letter of Heinrich IV.

References

Bitburg-Prüm